Towns under the federal government management:
Raduzhny (Радужный)
Cities and towns under the oblast's jurisdiction:
Vladimir (Владимир) (administrative center)
City districts:
Frunzensky (Фрунзенский)
Leninsky (Ленинский)
Oktyabrsky (Октябрьский)
Gus-Khrustalny (Гусь-Хрустальный)
Settlements (of urban type) under the town's jurisdiction:
Gusevsky (Гусевский)
Kovrov (Ковров)
Murom (Муром)
Districts:
Alexandrovsky (Александровский)
Towns under the district's jurisdiction:
Alexandrov (Александров)
Karabanovo (Карабаново)
Strunino (Струнино)
Settlements (of urban type) under the district's jurisdiction:
Balakirevo (Балакирево)
Gorokhovetsky (Гороховецкий)
Towns under the district's jurisdiction:
Gorokhovets (Гороховец)
Gus-Khrustalny (Гусь-Хрустальный)
Towns under the district's jurisdiction:
Kurlovo (Курлово)
Kameshkovsky (Камешковский)
Towns under the district's jurisdiction:
Kameshkovo (Камешково)
Kirzhachsky (Киржачский)
Towns under the district's jurisdiction:
Kirzhach (Киржач)
Kolchuginsky (Кольчугинский)
Towns under the district's jurisdiction:
Kolchugino (Кольчугино)
Kovrovsky (Ковровский)
Settlements (of urban type) under the district's jurisdiction:
Melekhovo (Мелехово)
Melenkovsky (Меленковский)
Towns under the district's jurisdiction:
Melenki (Меленки)
Muromsky (Муромский)
Petushinsky (Петушинский)
Towns under the district's jurisdiction:
Petushki (Петушки)
Kosteryovo (Костерёво)
Pokrov (Покров)
Settlements (of urban type) under the district's jurisdiction:
Gorodishchi (Городищи)
Volginsky (Вольгинский)
Selivanovsky (Селивановский)
Settlements (of urban type) under the district's jurisdiction:
Krasnaya Gorbatka (Красная Горбатка)
Sobinsky (Собинский)
Towns under the district's jurisdiction:
Lakinsk (Лакинск)
Sobinka (Собинка)
Settlements (of urban type) under the district's jurisdiction:
Stavrovo (Ставрово)
Sudogodsky (Судогодский)
Towns under the district's jurisdiction:
Sudogda (Судогда)
Suzdalsky (Суздальский)
Towns under the district's jurisdiction:
Suzdal (Суздаль)
Vyaznikovsky (Вязниковский)
Towns under the district's jurisdiction:
Vyazniki (Вязники)
Settlements (of urban type) under the district's jurisdiction:
Mstyora (Мстера)
Nikologory (Никологоры)
Yuryev-Polsky (Юрьев-Польский)
Towns under the district's jurisdiction:
Yuryev-Polsky (Юрьев-Польский)

References

Vladimir Oblast
Vladimir Oblast